Aby is both a given name and a surname. Notable people with the name include:

Aby Gartmann (1930–2018), Swiss bobsledder
Aby Maraño (born 1992), Filipino volleyball player
Aby Warburg (1866–1929), German art historian and cultural theorist
Jessica Aby (born 1998), Ivorian women's footballer

See also
Abby